Dumfries Academy is one of four secondary schools in Dumfries in south west Scotland. It is a state funded secondary school for both girls and boys.
The schools moto is "doctrina promovet" which translates from Latin to "learning promotes" which the school emphases within their "vision, values and aims".  There are two notable buildings; the Minerva Building 1895-7 by F J C Carruthers and a later building by County Architect John R Hill, 1936.

History
Dumfries Academy dates back to the 14th century, making it the earliest school in the Dumfries area. The school has occupied a number of different buildings, and has existed in its present form since 1804.

Early records show that John of Greyfriars, a monk, was appointed rector of a new school in Dumfries in 1330. Being a church school it concentrated on the study of religious texts, but in the centuries which followed other schools built in the town which taught subjects such as brewing, mathematics, English, baking, and needlework became integrated into the Academy building.

The Academy operated as a grammar school for those in Dumfries deemed academically gifted as based on exam results until July 1983. The most gifted students from three surrounding secondary schools, including Dumfries High School and Maxwelltown High School, transferred to the Academy after second year. As a result, Dumfries Academy had the highest rate of university entrance of any state school for many years.

The Minerva building 

The oldest building currently part of the school is the Minerva building. It was designed by prolific local architect F J C Carruthers, and built in 1895 -97 by stonemasons Houston and Robison. This is a two-storey building red sandstone in the English Baroque style with ornate carvings by sculptor James H. Douglas of Carlisle. The dome of the building features a gilded teak statue of Minerva, representing learning, from which the building gets its name. It was sculpted by Mr. Craig from Glasgow, following from the original architectural drawings by Carruthers. The Minerva building also features winged lions on either side of the door, and others around the cupola.  There is an extensive description in Buildings of Scotland: Dumfries and Galloway by John Gifford.

Uniform
The current uniform of Dumfries Academy consists of a white shirt, black trousers or skirt, a black blazer with the school crest attached and a maroon and black striped tie. During the 2006–2007 academic year, a senior tie consisting of a black background with white and maroon stripes and the school crest was introduced, to go along with the junior tie consisting of a maroon background with white and black stripes with the school crest. Junior Pupils from S1-S3 wear the junior tie and senior pupils from S4-6 wear the senior tie.
S6 pupils that are either head pupils or deputy head pupils will also wear stripes on their uniform, two stripes for head pupils and one for deputy head pupils.

Dumfries Academy today
The Academy has been a six-year comprehensive school since July 1985 serving part of the Burgh of Dumfries and surrounding rural communities, with an average roll of over 600 pupils and around 50 teaching staff. Students are placed into one of three houses in their first year; Barrie, Haining and Laurie, which are named after influential pupils that attended the school.

Notable people

Sir J.M.Barrie - writer of Peter Pan attended the school from 1873, and it was here where his first play Bandelero the Bandit was performed by the Dumfries Amateur Dramatic Club in 1877
Dr Aglionby Ross Carson, rector from 1801
Sir James Crichton-Browne, eminent psychiatrist and president of the Medico-Psychological Association
Rev. Dr. Henry Duncan, founder of the first savings bank
James Oswald Dykes, ordained to the Presbyterian ministry in 1859
Maurice Elliott, professional footballer
Christian Jane Fergusson, artist
 Lauren Irving - Master of Martial Arts
Alex Graham, cartoonist best known for the Fred Basset series
Jane Haining, Church of Scotland missionary who ultimately lost her life to the Nazis rather than betray her convictions
Dave Halliday, one of the highest goal scorers in UK football history and manager of Aberdeen to the Scottish League championship
Grant Hanley, professional footballer, Scotland internationalist
John Hanson, singer
Sir Alexander Knox Helm, civil servant who held several important diplomatic posts
Davie Irons, professional footballer and manager
Stephen Jardine, TV presenter
John Laurie, actor famous for Dad's Army
Lex Law, ex professional footballer and age group internationalist
Hugh McMillan, poet and now teacher at Dumfries Academy
Barry Nicholson, Scottish international footballer
Neil Oliver, archaeologist and author best known for his television work on the BBC series Coast and Two Men in a Trench
Don Peattie, ex professional association footballer and now Head of Sport at City of Sunderland College
Robin Philipson, artist
Dougie Sharpe, Scottish Football League internationalist
Dave Stevenson, Olympic pole vaulter and businessman
Ben Trueman, Hotel Babylon fictional semi professional hitman and part-time mystic
Jock Wishart, who in 1998 set a new world record for circumnavigating the globe in a powered vessel
Ray Wilson, former member of the bands Stiltskin and Genesis

Awards
In 2005, William McGair, History teacher at the Academy, was awarded the Scottish Daily Record Gold Award for Inspirational Teacher.

References

External links
Dumfries Academy website
Dumfries Academy's page on Scottish Schools Online

Secondary schools in Dumfries and Galloway
Dumfries
1804 establishments in Scotland
Educational institutions established in 1804